Dorcadion tuerki is a species of beetle in the family Cerambycidae. It was described by Ludwig Ganglbauer in 1884. It is known from Iran.

References

tuerki
Beetles described in 1884